Hesar-e Qujeh Baghi (also Romanized as Ḩeşār-e Qūjeh Bāghī; also known as Ḩaşār, Ḩeşār, Ḩeşār-e Gowjeh Bāghī, Ḩeşār-e Moḩammad Şāleḩ, Hisār, and Hisār Muhammad Sālih) is a village in Sardaran Rural District, in the Central District of Kabudarahang County, Hamadan Province, Iran. At the 2006 census, its population was 915, in 209 families.

References 

Populated places in Kabudarahang County